Justin Ackerman (born 17 March 1992) is a South African rugby union player, who most recently played with the . His regular position is prop.

Career

Youth

Ackerman went to school at Paarl Boys' High School, where he played for their first team in 2009 and 2010. In 2010, he was included in the Western Province side that played at the Under-18 Academy Week tournament, scoring a try in their final match against Boland U18s.

He played in ten matches for the  side during the 2011 Under-19 Provincial Championship, helping his side to the semi-finals of the competition, where they were beaten by eventual winners .

His side not only reached the final, but became Under-21 champions when they beat the s 30–23 in the final, with Ackerman playing the whole 80 minutes.

Western Province

Ackerman's first class debut came during the 2014 Vodacom Cup competition.

Golden Lions

References

1992 births
Living people
Rugby union players from Johannesburg
Rugby union props
South African rugby union players
Southern Kings players
Western Province (rugby union) players